John P. Murphy (June 18, 1926 – December 13, 1989) was a politician in the American state of Florida. He served in the Florida House of Representatives from 1966 to 1972, representing the 49th district.

References

1926 births
1989 deaths
Republican Party members of the Florida House of Representatives
20th-century American politicians
Florida State University alumni